The World Wide Blitz Tour was a 1981 concert tour by English heavy metal band Judas Priest where the band toured in Europe and North America from 13 February to 14 December 1981 in support of the album Point of Entry.

Overview

Europe (first leg)
For the first European leg of the tour, the band was supported by Saxon, who were promoting their album, "Strong Arm of the Law."

North American Leg
Savoy Brown supported the band for the first month of the leg until the end of May. Iron Maiden, who were promoting their album Killers, supported the band after that. Humble Pie would co-headline all of the June dates with Priest and Maiden. Whitesnake would then be the co-headliner throughout most of the July dates. Joe Perry opened a couple of the later shows in July.

The only official Judas Priest track recorded during this tour, a performance of "The Green Manalishi (With the Two Prong Crown)" from a show at Palladium in New York City, is featured on the "Some Heads Are Gonna Roll" single released in February 1984. The same track is found on the Metalogy box set.

Europe (final leg)
The final European leg was supported by Def Leppard, who were promoting their album, High 'n' Dry, and Accept.

Personnel
 Rob Halford – Lead vocals
 Glenn Tipton – Lead/rhythm guitar and background vocals
 K.K. Downing – Rhythm/lead guitar and background vocals
 Ian Hill – Bass and background vocals
 Dave Holland – Drums

Setlist
The setlist varied throughout the tour. The European leg had a setlist of:
 "Hell Bent For Leather"
 "The Ripper"
 "Diamonds & Rust" (Joan Baez cover)
 "Grinder"
 "Sinner"
 "Breaking the Law"
 "Beyond the Realms of Death"
 "Troubleshooter"
 "Metal Gods"
 "Hot Rockin'"
 "You Don't Have to Be Old to Be Wise"
 "Victim of Changes"
 "The Green Manalishi (With the Two Prong Crown)" (Fleetwood Mac cover)
 "Living After Midnight"
 "Tyrant"
The typical setlist for the North American leg and second European leg
 "Solar Angels"
 "Heading Out to the Highway"
 "Diamonds ^ Rust" (Replaced by "Metal Gods" on second European leg)
 "Troubleshooter" (Replaced by "Hell Bent for Leather" after 6 May 1981)
 "Breaking the Law"
 "Sinner"
 "Beyond the Realms of Death"
 "Grinder"
 "Desert Plains"
 "Hot Rockin'"
 "You Don't Have to Be Old to Be Wise"
 "Victim of Changes"
 "The Green Manalishi (With the Two Prong Crown)" (Fleetwood Mac cover)
 "Living After Midnight"
 "Tyrant"
Also occasionally played were:
 "United" (Played on 6 to 8 November and 12 December)
 "Genocide" (Played on 9 July)
 "Rapid Fire" (Played on 9 July)
 "Exciter" (Played on 9 July)

Tour dates

Boxscore

References

Judas Priest concert tours
1981 concert tours